Yale Gracey (September 3, 1910 – September 5, 1983) was a Disney Imagineer, writer, and layout artist for many Disney animated shorts, including classics such as The Three Caballeros and Fantasia. Gracey joined the company in 1939 as a layout artist for Pinocchio. In the 1960s, he designed many of the special effects for the Pirates of the Caribbean and Haunted Mansion attractions at Disneyland. Among these was a fire effect, developed for Pirates of the Caribbean, which appeared so realistic that the Disneyland fire department wanted an emergency switch to turn it off in case of a real fire. The Haunted Mansion character Master Gracey was named in homage to him. Gracey retired from the company on October 4, 1975.

On September 5, 1983, Gracey was shot and killed in Los Angeles by a burglar. His wife was injured in the attack. Gracey and his wife, Beverly, were staying overnight at their cabana at the Bel Air Bay Club, on Pacific Coast Highway in the Pacific Palisades neighborhood of western Los Angeles.  The shooting was reported at approximately 2:30 a.m. by another club member.  A police spokesman indicated that Gracey and his wife were both asleep when an unknown intruder entered and shot them both, then fled onto the beach.  A motive was not determined, and there were no suspects.

Family

Gracey was the grandson of Charles Gregory Yale (1847-1926), businessman and club man, Secretary of the San Francisco Yacht Club and 1st President of the Pacific Inter-Club Yacht Association. His great-grandfather was Gregory Yale (1817-1871), a mining claims and maritime lawyer who was involved in Senator Broderick's case, as well as with Salvador Vallejo, brother of Gen. Vallejo. His fortune amounted to $300,000 in 1857. He was also a real estate investor and an associate of Frank Turk, a pioneer of the city of San Francisco. His great-uncle, Frank Willey Yale (1854), was married to Fannie Amelia Bleecker, granddaughter of Major general Leonard Bleecker, a member of the Bleecker family of Bleecker Street, New York.

His father, Wilbur Tirrell Gracey (1877-1946) was a US Marshal and diplomat who served in consulates in China, Mexico, Spain, and the United Kingdom. His grandfather, Rev Samuel Levis Gracey (1835-1911) was a Methodist clergyman who had served in the Civil War as the chaplain for 6th Pennsylvania Cavalry ("Rush's Lancers"), 1st Division Cavalry Corps of the Army of the Potomac, and 2nd Pennsylvania Cavalry.

Disney filmography

References

External links
 

Walt Disney Animation Studios people
Disney imagineers
1910 births
1983 deaths
Deaths by firearm in California
People murdered in Los Angeles
American male writers
20th-century American writers
American expatriates in China